Cochylis eutaxia is a species of moth of the family Tortricidae. It is found in Baja California, Mexico.

References

Moths described in 1984
Cochylis